Romolo Archinto (died 4 September 1576) was a Roman Catholic prelate who served as Bishop of Novara (1574–1576).

Biography
On 26 April 1574, Romolo Archinto was appointed during the papacy of Pope Gregory XIII as Bishop of Novara.
On May 1574, he was consecrated bishop by Charles Borromeo, Archbishop of Milan. He served as Bishop of Novara until his death on 4 September 1576.

See also 
Catholic Church in Italy

References

External links and additional sources
 (for Chronology of Bishops) 
 (for Chronology of Bishops) 

16th-century Italian Roman Catholic bishops
Bishops appointed by Pope Gregory XIII
1576 deaths